Navneet Newshouse is an Indian weekly newspaper for children. It was started in 1996, and contains child-appropriate articles.

References

Weekly newspapers published in India
1996 establishments in Maharashtra
Newspapers established in 1996
Newspapers published in Mumbai